The Embassy of Pakistan, Abu Dhabi is the diplomatic mission representing Pakistan in the United Arab Emirates. The embassy is located in the Diplomatic Area in Abu Dhabi. Afzaal Mahmood is the incumbent Ambassador of Pakistan to the United Arab Emirates. Pakistan also has a Consulate-General in Dubai, which works under the embassy.

The Embassy provides various Consular services including Machine Readable Passports (MRP), NADRA ID cards, Visa, Attestation in addition to various Community Welfare Services. On average around 500 to 700 people visit the Embassy daily for various services.

The Embassy facilitated the repatriation of around 24,000 Pakistanis during the COVID-19 pandemic and around 60,000 Pakistanis in total if repatriations from Dubai are included, making it one of the largest international evacuation operations in the history of Pakistan.

See also

 Pakistan–United Arab Emirates relations
 List of diplomatic missions of Pakistan
 List of diplomatic missions in the United Arab Emirates

References

External links
 Embassy of Pakistan, Abu Dhabi

Year of establishment missing
Pakistan
Abu Dhabi
Pakistan–United Arab Emirates relations